The Union League Club is a private social club in New York City that was founded in 1863 in affiliation with the Union League. Its fourth and current clubhouse is located at 38 East 37th Street on the corner of Park Avenue, in the Murray Hill neighborhood of Manhattan. It was designed by Benjamin Wistar Morris and opened on February 2, 1931.  The building was designated a New York City landmark on October 25, 2011. The club is considered one of the most prestigious in New York City.

Union League clubs, which are legally separate but share similar histories and maintain reciprocal links with one another, are also located in Chicago and Philadelphia. Additional Union League clubs were formerly located in Brooklyn, New York and New Haven, Connecticut.

History

The club dates its founding from February 6, 1863, during the American Civil War.  Tensions were running high in New York City at the time, because much of the city's governing class, as well as its large Irish immigrant population, bitterly opposed the war and were eager to reach some kind of accommodation with the Confederate States of America.  Thus, pro-Union men chose to form their own club, with the twin goals of cultivating "a profound national devotion" and to "strengthen a love and respect for the Union." A foundational article of the club was the duty to resist and expose corruption, as well as to elevate the idea of American citizenship in the country.

The Union League (also known as Loyal Leagues) was actually a political movement before it became a social organization. Its members raised money both to support the United States Sanitary Commission, the forerunner of the American Red Cross, which cared for the Union wounded following battles, and the Union cause generally.

The New York League was founded by four prominent professionals and intellectuals: Henry Whitney Bellows, Frederick Law Olmsted, George Templeton Strong, and Oliver Wolcott Gibbs. The men, all members of the United States Sanitary Commission, desired to strengthen the nation state and the national identity. They first aimed to recruit a coalition of moneyed professionals like themselves. Strong believed that the club would only thrive with a respectable catalogue of moneyed men. Olmsted especially desired to recruit the new generation of young, wealthy men, so that the club might teach them the obligations and duties of the upper class.

The founders aimed to win the political governing elite over to support the Union and to abolish slavery. They also believed that a centralized government was essential to their prosperity. The national government enforced contracts, tariffs, and an expanding infrastructure, all in the best interest of the professionals in the merchant, financial, and manufacturing classes, which in turn, benefited the population at large. These professionals also Developed an economic interest in the federal government,  because as the war progressed, Union League ideas had their effect and New York City's elite bore a disproportional amount of the nation's debt. As they bought more and more war bonds, the holders had an increasing economic interest in the success of the Union, in addition to the convictions that led them to buy the bonds in the first place.

The club held its first official meeting on March 20, 1863. At this first meeting, Robert B. Minturn, head of the nation's second largest shipping firm, was elected president. Some of the elected vice presidents included William H. Aspinwall, Moses Taylor, and Alexander T. Stewart.

It did not take long for the club's enemies to make their displeasure felt with the new organization. On July 13, 1863, just five months after the club's foundation and only days after receiving word of the twin Union victories at Gettysburg and at Vicksburg, the New York Draft Riots exploded right in the club's backyard. The Union League Club was high on the vandals' list of targets (right after the Colored Orphan Asylum), but some brave members kept them at bay by maintaining an armed vigil in the locked and barricaded clubhouse on East 17th Street, just off Union Square Park.

A few months later, the members decided to make an unmistakable gesture that they had not been intimidated. Authorized by the U.S. War Department, the club decided to recruit, train and equip a Colored infantry regiment for Union service.  The 20th U.S. Colored Infantry was formed on Riker's Island in February 1864. The next month, it marched from the Union League Club, down Canal Street and over to the Hudson River piers to embark for duty in Louisiana. In spite of numerous threats, the members of the Union League Club marched with the men of the 20th, and saw them off. During World War I, the club sponsored the 369th Infantry, the famed Harlem Hellfighters, which was commanded by William Hayward, a club member.

During Reconstruction, a major era of civil rights changes, Union Leagues were formed all across the South. They mobilized freedmen to register to vote. They discussed political issues, promoted civic projects, and mobilized workers opposed to segregationist white employers. Most branches were segregated but there were a few that were racially integrated. The leaders of the all-black units were mostly urban Blacks from the North, who had never been slaves. Foner (p 283) says "virtually every Black voter in the South had enrolled." Black League members were special targets of the Ku Klux Klan's violence and intimidation, so the Leagues organized informal armed defense units.

After the end of Reconstruction, the Union League Club of New York devoted itself to civic projects and clean government. It and its members helped to found the Metropolitan Museum of Art, Grant's Tomb, and the Statue of Abraham Lincoln on Union Square, Manhattan. They also  assisted in building the Statue of Liberty by raising funds through Edouard de Laboulaye and William Maxwell Evarts, as well as funding the Statue's pedestal through a committee chaired by member John Jay.

Previous clubhouses

The ULC's first clubhouse, built in 1863 was at 26 East 17th Street, facing Union Square. The second clubhouse was the Jerome Mansion, the childhood home of Winston S. Churchill's mother Jennie Jerome, at Madison Avenue and East 26th Street, facing Madison Square Park (1868). 

The club then moved to Fifth Avenue and West 39th Street (1881); the building included decor designed by Frank Hill Smith, John La Farge, Augustus Saint-Gaudens, and Will Hicok Low. The club remained there until the move to the present building at 37th Street and Park Avenue.  The property was purchased from J.P. Morgan II.  Unlike many club buildings, the current clubhouse is purpose-built, rather than being a converted mansion or building constructed for another purpose.

Membership

The club has always promoted clean government and public-spiritedness. Many of its early members, notably cartoonist Thomas Nast, were instrumental in breaking "Boss" Tweed's corrupted political organization. (A future club president, Elihu Root, served as one of Tweed's defense counsels.) Manhattan District Attorney and club member Charles S. Whitman used the privacy afforded by the club to secretly interview witnesses during his investigation of the case that sent NYPD Lt. Charles Becker, a corrupted police officer, to the electric chair in 1915. Whitman had previously founded the Night Court and was elected New York Governor as a result of the trial.

In all, 15 U.S. Presidents have been members of the club. Two presidents, Theodore Roosevelt and Chester A. Arthur, were members of the club prior to entering the White House and former presidents resident in New York, notably Ulysses S. Grant and Herbert Hoover, were active members.

Theodore Roosevelt was blackballed when he first applied for membership in 1881, possibly because his mother, Martha Bulloch Roosevelt, was a well-known Confederate sympathizer. Following the sudden deaths of his wife and mother in 1884, however, he was offered membership and accepted. After running on the Bull Moose Party ticket in 1912, Roosevelt was persona non grata at the club for several years, being welcomed back after the United States entered World War I.

Long a men's club, it decided to admit women in the 1980s. Faith Whittlesey, President Reagan's Ambassador to Switzerland was the first female member (1986). Women now play prominent roles in the club's leadership including the Board of Governors, the Admissions Committee, the Public Affairs Committee, and the House Committee. In 2020, the club elected its first woman president, Mary Beth Sullivan.

Sandra Day O'Connor, and Henry Kissinger are Honorary Members, as were Neil Armstrong, Margaret Thatcher, Antonin Scalia, Brent Scowcroft, Barbara Bush, and H. Norman Schwarzkopf.

The club has a strong artistic tradition (see list of members below). Some artist-members in the 19th century contributed paintings to the club in lieu of dues, and these remain part of the club's collection.

Awards

The club bestows four awards: The Lincoln Literary Award to outstanding American authors; The Theodore Roosevelt American Experience Award to individuals who have "enriched the American experience"; The American History Award to an individual who has had a significant and/or enduring impact on, or relating to American History; and The Eastman Johnson Award, to individuals whose unique contributions to art and culture have elevated the ideals of American Citizenship.

Notable members

 Abraham Lincoln, 16th President of the United States, led the Union
 Ulysses S. Grant, Commanding General, United States Army, 18th President of the United States
 George B. Adams, federal judge;
 Chester A. Arthur, 21st President of the United States
 Henry Whitney Bellows, Clergyman and social reformer
 Albert Bierstadt, Hudson River School artist
 Cornelius Newton Bliss, 21st United States Secretary of the Interior, club president, 1902–1906
 Isaac Vail Brokaw, founder of Brokaw Brothers and housing group on 5th Ave
 William Cullen Bryant, poet and editor of the New York Post
 George H. W. Bush, 41st President of the United States
 George W. Bush, 43rd President of the United States
 Willard C. Butcher, Chairman and CEO of Chase Manhattan Bank
 Thomas B. Clarke, art collector and chairman of the art committee
 Samuel Colman, Hudson River School artist
 Peter Cooper, inventor and philanthropist
 Jasper Francis Cropsey, Hudson River School artist
 Noah Davis, Judge for the New York Supreme Court, club vice president
 Henry Pomeroy Davison, Chairman of the War Council (WWI) of the American Red Cross
 Chauncey Depew, U.S. senator, corporate lawyer; club president, 1886–1892
 John Ericsson, Swedish-American inventor of the USS Monitor
 William M. Evarts, U.S. Attorney General; Secretary of State of the United States; club president, 1882–1885
 Milton Ezrati, Chief Economist at Vested
 Cyrus West Field, "Father" of the Atlantic cable
 Sanford Robinson Gifford, Hudson River School artist
 Martin Johnson Heade, Hudson River School artist
 Herbert Hoover, Engineer, humanitarian, 31st President of the United States
 Charles Evans Hughes, Secretary of State of the United States, Chief Justice, U.S. Supreme Court; club president, 1917–1919
 Daniel Huntington, Genre artist
 Jack H. Jacobs, Medal of Honor recipient
 John Jay, son of Founding Father John Jay and U.S. Minister to Austria-Hungary
 Eastman Johnson, 19th century American artist
 John Stewart Kennedy, American businessman, financier and philanthropist
 John Frederick Kensett, Hudson River School artist
 Lawrence Kudlow, Director of the National Economic Council
 Emanuel Leutze, American history painter
 Homer Loring, American industrialist, died in his room at the club
 Alfred Erskine Marling, Real estate developer; club president, 1928–1930
 Nelson A. Miles, Union Civil War general. Last man to hold the title Commanding General of the United States Army
 J.P. Morgan, Wall Street financier
 J.P. Morgan Jr., Wall Street financier
 Levi P. Morton, 22nd Vice President of the United States, Governor of New York
 Thomas Nast, Political cartoonist and artist
 Frederick Law Olmsted, landscape architect, designer of Central Park
 Charles Henry Parkhurst, clergyman and social reformer who broke Boss Tweed's ring
 Horace Porter, Union Army officer, personal secretary to General and President Ulysses S. Grant, U.S. Ambassador to France, club president, 1893–1897
 Frederic Remington, Western artist
 J.D. Rockefeller, founder of Standard Oil
 Theodore Roosevelt, Rough Rider, New York Governor, 26th President of the United States
 Elihu Root, Secretary of War, Secretary of State of the United States, club president, 1898–1899; 1915–1916
 Joseph Seligman, Banker, philanthropist
 Elliott Fitch Shepard, lawyer and banker
 William T. Sherman, Union Civil War general
 George Templeton Strong, Civil War diarist, Union League founding member
 Salem Howe Wales, journalist, reformist politician, and philanthropist
 Charles S. Whitman, New York Governor and Manhattan District Attorney
 Faith Ryan Whittlesey, Ambassador to Switzerland and Assistant to Ronald Reagan for Public Liaison
 Worthington Whittredge, Hudson River School and Western artist
 William Woodin, Treasury Secretary under Franklin D. Roosevelt

See also
 Union League
 Union League of Philadelphia
 Union League Club of Chicago
 Union League Golf and Country Club
 List of American gentlemen's clubs

References

External links

Documenting the Gilded Age: New York City Exhibitions at the Turn of the 20th Century A New York Art Resources Consortium project. Exhibition catalogs from the Union League Club of New York.
Architectural essay on the 5th Avenue and 39th Street clubhouse.

1863 establishments in New York (state)
Gentlemen's clubs in New York City
Murray Hill, Manhattan
New York (state) in the American Civil War
Park Avenue
United States Sanitary Commission
New York City Designated Landmarks in Manhattan